2-Pyridone is an organic compound with the formula . It is a colourless solid. It is well known to form hydrogen bonded dimers and it is also a classic case of a compound that exists as tautomers.

Tautomerism 

The second tautomer is 2-hydroxypyridine. This lactam lactim tautomerism can also be exhibited in many related compounds.

Tautomerism in the solid state 
The amide group can be involved in hydrogen bonding to other nitrogen- and oxygen-containing species.

The predominant solid state form is 2-pyridone. This has been confirmed by X-ray crystallography which shows that the hydrogen in solid state is closer to the nitrogen than to the oxygen (because of the low electron density at the hydrogen the exact positioning is difficult), and IR-spectroscopy, which shows that the C=O longitudinal frequency is present whilst the O-H frequencies are absent.

Tautomerism in solution 
The tautomerization has been exhaustively studied. The energy difference appears to be very small. Non-polar solvents favour 2-hydroxypyridine whereas polar solvents such as alcohols and water favour the 2-pyridone.

The energy difference for the two tautomers in the gas phase was measured by IR-spectroscopy to be 2.43 to 3.3 kJ/mol for the solid state and 8.95 kJ/mol and 8.83 kJ/mol  for the liquid state.

Tautomerisation mechanism A
The single molecular tautomerisation has a forbidden 1-3 suprafacial transition state and therefore has a high energy barrier for this tautomerisation, which was calculated with theoretical methods to be 125 or 210 kJ/mol.  The direct tautomerisation is energetically not favoured. There are other possible mechanisms for this tautomerisation.

Dimerisation

2-Pyridone and 2-hydroxypyridine can form dimers with two hydrogen bonds.

Aggregation in the solid state
In the solid state the dimeric form is not present; the 2-pyridones form a helical structure over hydrogen bonds.  Some substituted 2-pyridones form the dimer in solid state, for example the 5-methyl-3-carbonitrile-2-pyridone. The determination of all these structures was done by X-ray crystallography.
In the solid state the hydrogen is located closer to the oxygen so it could be considered to be right to call the colourless crystals in the flask 2-pyridone.

Aggregation in solution
In solution the dimeric form is present; the ratio of dimerisation is strongly dependent on the polarity of the solvent. Polar and protic solvents interact with the hydrogen bonds and more monomer is formed. Hydrophobic effects in non-polar solvents lead to a predominance of the dimer. The ratio of the tautomeric forms is also dependent on the solvent. All possible tautomers and dimers can be present and form an equilibrium, and the exact measurement of all the equilibrium constants in the system is extremely difficult.

(NMR-spectroscopy is a slow method, high resolution IR-spectroscopy in solvent is difficult, the broad absorption in UV-spectroscopy makes it hard to discriminate 3 and more very similar molecules).

Some publications only focus one of the two possible patterns, and neglect the influence of the other. For example, to calculation of the energy difference of the two tautomers in a non-polar solution will lead to a wrong result if a large quantity of the substance is on the side of the dimer in an equilibrium.

Tautomerisation mechanism B
The direct tautomerisation is not energetically favoured, but a dimerisation followed by a double proton transfer and dissociation of the dimer is a self catalytic path from one tautomer to the other. Protic solvents also mediate the proton transfer during the tautomerisation.

Synthesis
2-Pyrone can be obtained by a cyclisation reaction, and converted to 2-pyridone via an exchange reaction with ammonia:

Pyridine forms an N-oxide with some oxidation agents such as hydrogen peroxide. This pyridine-N-oxide undergoes a rearrangement reaction to 2-pyridone in acetic anhydride:

In the Guareschi-Thorpe condensation cyanoacetamide reacts with a 1,3-diketone to a 2-pyridone. The reaction is named after Icilio Guareschi and Jocelyn Field Thorpe.

Chemical properties

Catalytic activity
2-Pyridone catalyses a variety of proton-dependent reactions, for example the aminolysis of esters.  In some cases, molten 2-pyridone is used as a solvent. 2-Pyridone has a large effect on the reaction from activated esters with amines in nonpolar solvent, which is attributed to its tautomerisation and utility as a ditopic receptor.  Proton transfer from 2-pyridone and its tautomer have been investigated by isotope labeling, kinetics and quantum chemical methods.

Coordination chemistry
2-Pyridone and some derivatives serve as ligands in coordination chemistry, usually as a 1,3-bridging ligand akin to carboxylate.

In nature
2-Pyridone is not naturally occurring, but a derivative has been isolated as a cofactor in certain hydrogenases.

Environmental behavior
2-Pyridone is rapidly degraded by microorganisms in the soil environment, with a half life less than one week.  Organisms capable of growth on 2-pyridone as a sole source of carbon, nitrogen, and energy have been isolated by a number of researchers. The most extensively studied 2-pyridone degrader is the gram positive bacterium Arthrobacter crystallopoietes, a member of the phylum Actinomycetota which includes numerous related organisms that have been shown to degrade pyridine or one or more alkyl-, carboxyl-, or hydroxyl-substituted pyridines.  2-Pyridone degradation is commonly initiated by mono-oxygenase attack, resulting in a diol, such as 2,5-dihydroxypyridine, which is metabolized via the maleamate pathway.  Fission of the ring proceeds via action of 2,5-dihydroxypyridine monooxygenase, which is also involved in metabolism of nicotinic acid via the maleamate pathway.  In the case of Arthrobacter crystallopoietes, at least part of the degradative pathway is plasmid-borne.  Pyridine diols undergo chemical transformation in solution to form intensely colored pigments.  Similar pigments have been observed in quinoline degradation, also owing to transformation of metabolites, however the yellow pigments often reported in degradation of many pyridine solvents, such as unsubstituted pyridine or picoline, generally result from overproduction of riboflavin in the presence of these solvents.  Generally speaking, degradation of pyridones, dihydroxypyridines, and pyridinecarboxylic acids is commonly mediated by oxygenases, whereas degradation of pyridine solvents often is not, and may in some cases involve an initial reductive step.

See also
 2-Pyridone (data page)
 2-Pyrone
 4-Pyridone
The 5-methyl-2-pyridone is used to make pirfenidone.

References

Further reading

General

Tautomerism

</ref><ref>

Catalysts
 
Lactims